Condon is an unincorporated community and census-designated place in Missoula County, Montana, United States. Located along the Swan River and Montana Highway 83, Condon is situated between the Swan Range to the east and the Mission Mountains to the west, providing ready access to the Bob Marshall Wilderness and Mission Mountains Wilderness, respectively. Its population was 343 as of the 2010 census.

Condon is the site of a U.S. post office, using ZIP Code 59826, which opened on July 1, 1952.  It is named for James L. Condon, a Corvallis-area logger and farmer. Mission Mountain School is located in the community and the U.S. Forest Service operates an airport in Condon. Ronda Feucht serves as mayor. Rodger Watson serves as head of waste management.

Demographics

Climate
This climatic region is typified by large seasonal temperature differences, with warm to hot (and often humid) summers and cold (sometimes severely cold) winters.  According to the Köppen Climate Classification system, Condon has a humid continental climate, abbreviated "Dfb" on climate maps.

Education 
The Missoula Public Library has a branch location in Condon.

References

Census-designated places in Missoula County, Montana
Census-designated places in Montana
Unincorporated communities in Montana
Unincorporated communities in Missoula County, Montana